Bouteldja  is a town and commune in El Taref Province, Algeria. According to the 1998 census it has a population of 15,275.

Chadli Bendjedid, third president of Algeria was born in this town.

References

Communes of El Taref Province